The Gate is a retail and leisure complex in Newcastle upon Tyne, England.

History 
The venue takes its name from the street on which it stands, Newgate Street. It is part of the historic Grainger Town area of Newcastle. The noted concert hall the Mayfair Ballroom was among the buildings demolished to make way for The Gate. It was opened on 28 November 2002.

The Gate has 19 venues spread across three floors, including a 16-screen Cineworld Cinema and Aspers Casino. The Gate is also next to Newcastle's Chinatown; there is an entrance on Stowell Street. The Gate building was built to replace the 35-year-old, 7-storey Newgate House, which was home to the prolific music venue; The Mayfair club. Mood Bar opened on 28 November 2002, the same time as The Gate.

The 19,235 m2, £80 million venue was built by Land Securities and the  sculpture outside, "Ellipsis Eclipses", was designed by Danny Lane. The  glass façade was designed by Space Decks Limited. The Odeon Cinema (later Empire, now Cineworld) was built to replace the 71-year-old Odeon/Paramount cinema on Pilgrim Street, which after the Gate's opening remained disused until its demolition in 2017. The Gate provided 400 new jobs when opened and a further 600 during construction.

In 2004 BDP Lighting won a Lighting Design award for their work at The Gate.

The Gate won the Property Week award for Best Commercial UK Mixed-Use Leisure Scheme, and the British Toilet Association awarded The Gate a Loo of the Year Award and awarded it five stars.

In 2010 Jamie Ritblat's property company, Delancey, bought The Gate in a £900 million package of properties from PropInvest Group, in partnership with the Royal Bank of Scotland. In 2012 The Gate was sold to the Crown Estate for £60 million.

Venues 

Entertainment
 Aspers Casino
 Cineworld Cinema
 YumeWorld Family Entertainment Centre
 Escape Newcastle - Escape Rooms
 The CTRL Pad - Video Gaming Lounge
 Game of Throwing - Axe-Throwing Range
 Selfie Station
 Bars and nightclubs
 JD Wetherspoons - The Keel Row
 WonderBar
 Restaurants
 Nando's
 Pizza Hut
 The Mayfair
Retail
 Vintage Vera - Second-hand Clothing

References

External links 

 
 3D Pamoramas of The Gate at quicktimevirtualreality.com and at BBC.co.uk

Buildings and structures in Newcastle upon Tyne
Buildings and structures completed in 2002
Shopping malls established in 2002
2002 establishments in England